Banks Township is one of twenty townships in Fayette County, Iowa, USA.  As of the 2010 census, its population was 326.

Geography
According to the United States Census Bureau, Banks Township covers an area of 36.53 square miles (94.61 square kilometers).

The east edge of the city of Sumner extends into this township but is a separate entity.

Adjacent townships
 Bethel Township (north)
 Windsor Township (northeast)
 Center Township (east)
 Harlan Township (southeast)
 Fremont Township (south)
 Dayton Township, Bremer County (southwest)
 Sumner No. 2 Township, Bremer County (west)
 Sumner Township, Bremer County (west)
 Sumner Township (west)
 Fredericksburg Township, Chickasaw County (northwest)

Cemeteries
The township contains Union Evangelical Cemetery.

Major highways
  Iowa Highway 93

School districts
 North Fayette Valley Community School District
 Sumner-Fredericksburg Community School District
 West Central Community School District

Political districts
 Iowa's 1st congressional district
 State House District 18
 State Senate District 9

References
 United States Census Bureau 2008 TIGER/Line Shapefiles
 United States Board on Geographic Names (GNIS)
 United States National Atlas

External links
 US-Counties.com
 City-Data.com

Townships in Fayette County, Iowa
Townships in Iowa